The Great British Quiz is a British game show that aired on BBC1 from 31 January 1994 to 24 October 1995. It is hosted by Janice Long for the first series and then hosted by Philip Hayton for the second and third series.

Transmissions

References

External links

1994 British television series debuts
1995 British television series endings
BBC television game shows
1990s British game shows
English-language television shows